Sun Siang-chong (born 24 April 1946), better known by his stage name Chin Han, is a Taiwanese actor born in Shanghai. His father was born in Chengdu, Sichuan.

Background
Born 'Sun Siang-chong on 24 April 1946 Shanghai, his father is the Chinese general Sun Yuanliang. Chin Han is best known for starring in a number of adaptations from Chiung Yao's novels in the 1970s and 1980s, usually opposite Brigitte Lin (in films) and Leanne Liu (on television). With Charlie Chin, Brigitte Lin and Joan Lin, the four eventually became known as the "Two Chins, Two Lins" which became iconic of 1970s romance films in China.

Personal life
Sun married Shao Chiao-ying in 1971. Only a year later he was involved in a relationship with Brigitte Lin. Shao gave birth to his daughter Sun Shi Wen and a son Richard Sun. Because of his relationship with Lin, him and Shao often got into arguments which eventually ended in divorce in 1984.

Filmography

Film
 As actor

 As director
 The Drug Busters (鐵血勇探) – also actor

 As writer
 Betrayer (殺氣嚴霜) – also actor

Television series

References
 Daw-Ming Lee. "Chin, Han". Historical Dictionary of Taiwan Cinema. (2013) . pp. 118–120.

External links

Taiwanese male film actors
Male actors from Shanghai
Living people
1946 births
Participants in Chinese reality television series
Taiwanese people from Shanghai